Petrocodon is a diverse genus of the family Gesneriaceae found in Southern China. Petrocodon formerly had few species, but recent genetic analysis has refined our understanding of the genus. Calcareoboea, Paralagarosolen, Dolicholoma and Tengia monotypic genera have been transferred to Petrocodon, as well as some Didymocarpus and Lagarosolen species.

The following species are in Petrocodon:

 Petrocodon albinervius
 Petrocodon bonii
 Petrocodon coccineus
 Petrocodon coriaceifolius
 Petrocodon dealbatus
 Petrocodon fangianus
 Petrocodon ferrugineus
 Petrocodon hancei
 Petrocodon hechiensis
 Petrocodon hispidus
 Petrocodon integrifolius
 Petrocodon jingxiensis
 Petrocodon laxicymosus
 Petrocodon longgangensis
 Petrocodon lui
 Petrocodon mollifolius
 Petrocodon multiflorus
 Petrocodon niveolanosus
 Petrocodon pseudocoriaceifolius
 Petrocodon scopulorum
 Petrocodon tiandengensis

References

Flora of China
Gesneriaceae genera